The Magnitogorsk constituency (No.192) is a Russian legislative constituency in Chelyabinsk Oblast. The constituency covers southern Chelyabinsk Oblast.

Members elected

Election results

1993

|-
! colspan=2 style="background-color:#E9E9E9;text-align:left;vertical-align:top;" |Candidate
! style="background-color:#E9E9E9;text-align:left;vertical-align:top;" |Party
! style="background-color:#E9E9E9;text-align:right;" |Votes
! style="background-color:#E9E9E9;text-align:right;" |%
|-
|style="background-color:#0085BE"|
|align=left|Aleksandr Pochinok
|align=left|Choice of Russia
|
|50.54%
|-
|style="background-color:"|
|align=left|Aleksandr Smirnov
|align=left|Independent
| -
|15.40%
|-
| colspan="5" style="background-color:#E9E9E9;"|
|- style="font-weight:bold"
| colspan="3" style="text-align:left;" | Total
| 
| 100%
|-
| colspan="5" style="background-color:#E9E9E9;"|
|- style="font-weight:bold"
| colspan="4" |Source:
|
|}

1995

|-
! colspan=2 style="background-color:#E9E9E9;text-align:left;vertical-align:top;" |Candidate
! style="background-color:#E9E9E9;text-align:left;vertical-align:top;" |Party
! style="background-color:#E9E9E9;text-align:right;" |Votes
! style="background-color:#E9E9E9;text-align:right;" |%
|-
|style="background-color:#3A46CE"|
|align=left|Aleksandr Pochinok (incumbent)
|align=left|Democratic Choice of Russia – United Democrats
|
|40.55%
|-
|style="background-color:"|
|align=left|Aleksandr Zaplatin
|align=left|Independent
|
|16.53%
|-
|style="background-color:"|
|align=left|Zoya Pronina
|align=left|Communist Party
|
|10.64%
|-
|style="background-color:"|
|align=left|Grigory Petukhov
|align=left|Agrarian Party
|
|8.70%
|-
|style="background-color:"|
|align=left|Dinus Safiullin
|align=left|Independent
|
|8.57%
|-
|style="background-color:"|
|align=left|Gennady Monetov
|align=left|Independent
|
|5.79%
|-
|style="background-color:#000000"|
|colspan=2 |against all
|
|7.53%
|-
| colspan="5" style="background-color:#E9E9E9;"|
|- style="font-weight:bold"
| colspan="3" style="text-align:left;" | Total
| 
| 100%
|-
| colspan="5" style="background-color:#E9E9E9;"|
|- style="font-weight:bold"
| colspan="4" |Source:
|
|}

1997

|-
! colspan=2 style="background-color:#E9E9E9;text-align:left;vertical-align:top;" |Candidate
! style="background-color:#E9E9E9;text-align:left;vertical-align:top;" |Party
! style="background-color:#E9E9E9;text-align:right;" |Votes
! style="background-color:#E9E9E9;text-align:right;" |%
|-
|style="background-color:"|
|align=left|Aleksandr Chershintsev
|align=left|Independent
|-
|56.25%
|-
| colspan="5" style="background-color:#E9E9E9;"|
|- style="font-weight:bold"
| colspan="3" style="text-align:left;" | Total
| -
| 100%
|-
| colspan="5" style="background-color:#E9E9E9;"|
|- style="font-weight:bold"
| colspan="4" |Source:
|
|}

1999

|-
! colspan=2 style="background-color:#E9E9E9;text-align:left;vertical-align:top;" |Candidate
! style="background-color:#E9E9E9;text-align:left;vertical-align:top;" |Party
! style="background-color:#E9E9E9;text-align:right;" |Votes
! style="background-color:#E9E9E9;text-align:right;" |%
|-
|style="background-color:"|
|align=left|Aleksandr Chershintsev (incumbent)
|align=left|Independent
|
|38.65%
|-
|style="background-color:#1042A5"|
|align=left|Pavel Krasheninnikov
|align=left|Union of Right Forces
|
|31.20%
|-
|style="background-color:"|
|align=left|Aleksandr Dobchinsky
|align=left|Independent
|
|8.64%
|-
|style="background-color:"|
|align=left|Aleksandr Smirnov
|align=left|Independent
|
|4.81%
|-
|style="background-color:"|
|align=left|Zhakslyk Altynbayev
|align=left|Our Home – Russia
|
|4.07%
|-
|style="background-color:"|
|align=left|Gennady Yermakov
|align=left|Liberal Democratic Party
|
|1.28%
|-
|style="background-color:#084284"|
|align=left|Irina Belyakova
|align=left|Spiritual Heritage
|
|1.16%
|-
|style="background-color:#C62B55"|
|align=left|Anton Kruglyashev
|align=left|Peace, Labour, May
|
|0.95%
|-
|style="background-color:"|
|align=left|Iosif Abramov
|align=left|Independent
|
|0.63%
|-
|style="background-color:#000000"|
|colspan=2 |against all
|
|6.65%
|-
| colspan="5" style="background-color:#E9E9E9;"|
|- style="font-weight:bold"
| colspan="3" style="text-align:left;" | Total
| 
| 100%
|-
| colspan="5" style="background-color:#E9E9E9;"|
|- style="font-weight:bold"
| colspan="4" |Source:
|
|}

2003

|-
! colspan=2 style="background-color:#E9E9E9;text-align:left;vertical-align:top;" |Candidate
! style="background-color:#E9E9E9;text-align:left;vertical-align:top;" |Party
! style="background-color:#E9E9E9;text-align:right;" |Votes
! style="background-color:#E9E9E9;text-align:right;" |%
|-
|style="background-color:#1042A5"|
|align=left|Pavel Krasheninnikov
|align=left|Union of Right Forces
|
|48.45%
|-
|style="background-color:"|
|align=left|Aleksandr Chershintsev (incumbent)
|align=left|United Russia
|
|12.96%
|-
|style="background-color:"|
|align=left|Zoya Pronina
|align=left|Communist Party
|
|6.79%
|-
|style="background-color:#C21022"|
|align=left|Vladimir Dubrovsky
|align=left|Russian Pensioners' Party-Party of Social Justice
|
|6.46%
|-
|style="background-color:"|
|align=left|Vladimir Glukhovsky
|align=left|Independent
|
|4.17%
|-
|style="background-color:"|
|align=left|Aleksey Garayev
|align=left|Agrarian Party
|
|4.00%
|-
|style="background-color:"|
|align=left|Valery Levandovsky
|align=left|Independent
|
|3.47%
|-
|style="background-color:"|
|align=left|Yury Chetyrkin
|align=left|Independent
|
|1.18%
|-
|style="background-color:"|
|align=left|Dmitry Soldatkin
|align=left|Independent
|
|0.69%
|-
|style="background-color:#000000"|
|colspan=2 |against all
|
|10.02%
|-
| colspan="5" style="background-color:#E9E9E9;"|
|- style="font-weight:bold"
| colspan="3" style="text-align:left;" | Total
| 
| 100%
|-
| colspan="5" style="background-color:#E9E9E9;"|
|- style="font-weight:bold"
| colspan="4" |Source:
|
|}

2016

|-
! colspan=2 style="background-color:#E9E9E9;text-align:left;vertical-align:top;" |Candidate
! style="background-color:#E9E9E9;text-align:leftt;vertical-align:top;" |Party
! style="background-color:#E9E9E9;text-align:right;" |Votes
! style="background-color:#E9E9E9;text-align:right;" |%
|-
| style="background-color: " |
|align=left|Vitaly Bakhmetyev
|align=left|United Russia
|
|49.04%
|-
| style="background-color: " |
|align=left|Olga Mukhometyarova
|align=left|A Just Russia
|
|14.86%
|-
|style="background-color:"|
|align=left|Nikolay Fedorov
|align=left|Liberal Democratic Party
|
|9.73%
|-
|style="background-color:"|
|align=left|Igor Yegorov
|align=left|Communist Party
|
|7.29%
|-
|style="background-color: " |
|align=left|Aleksey Garayev
|align=left|Party of Growth
|
|4.91%
|-
|style="background-color:"|
|align=left|Olga Korda
|align=left|Rodina
|
|4.37%
|-
|style="background-color:"|
|align=left|Nikolay Drozdov
|align=left|Communists of Russia
|
|4.04%
|-
|style="background-color: " |
|align=left|Sergey Shichkov
|align=left|Yabloko
|
|1.51%
|-
| colspan="5" style="background-color:#E9E9E9;"|
|- style="font-weight:bold"
| colspan="3" style="text-align:left;" | Total
| 
| 100%
|-
| colspan="5" style="background-color:#E9E9E9;"|
|- style="font-weight:bold"
| colspan="4" |Source:
|
|}

2021

|-
! colspan=2 style="background-color:#E9E9E9;text-align:left;vertical-align:top;" |Candidate
! style="background-color:#E9E9E9;text-align:left;vertical-align:top;" |Party
! style="background-color:#E9E9E9;text-align:right;" |Votes
! style="background-color:#E9E9E9;text-align:right;" |%
|-
|style="background-color: " |
|align=left|Vitaly Bakhmetyev (incumbent)
|align=left|United Russia
|
|40.63%
|-
|style="background-color:"|
|align=left|Elmar Rustamov
|align=left|Communist Party
|
|10.22%
|-
|style="background-color:"|
|align=left|Pavel Vladelshchikov
|align=left|A Just Russia — For Truth
|
|9.68%
|-
|style="background-color:"|
|align=left|Damir Baytenov
|align=left|Liberal Democratic Party
|
|9.59%
|-
|style="background-color:"|
|align=left|Tatyana Mararash
|align=left|New People
|
|7.06%
|-
|style="background-color: " |
|align=left|Maksim Stepanov
|align=left|Communists of Russia
|
|6.90%
|-
|style="background-color: "|
|align=left|Aleksandr Ishimov
|align=left|Party of Pensioners
|
|5.61%
|-
|style="background-color: "|
|align=left|Sergey Toropov
|align=left|Russian Party of Freedom and Justice
|
|2.80%
|-
|style="background-color:"|
|align=left|Vasily German
|align=left|Rodina
|
|1.77%
|-
|style="background-color: " |
|align=left|Nikolay Koshman
|align=left|Yabloko
|
|1.18%
|-
| colspan="5" style="background-color:#E9E9E9;"|
|- style="font-weight:bold"
| colspan="3" style="text-align:left;" | Total
| 
| 100%
|-
| colspan="5" style="background-color:#E9E9E9;"|
|- style="font-weight:bold"
| colspan="4" |Source:
|
|}

Notes

References

Russian legislative constituencies
Politics of Chelyabinsk Oblast